Sky News at Five (formerly Live at Five) and Sky News at Six were the titles of Sky News' authoritative hour-long evening news round-ups, beginning at 5pm and 6pm, British time.

Format
Until October 2016, the slot was anchored by Jeremy Thompson on weekdays, providing a round-up of all the day's events and coverage of any late-breaking news. The programme ran until 6:30pm (7pm on Fridays), although the 6-7pm hour was known as Sky News at Six. The programme was branded Live at Five from the channel's launch in 1989 until April 2011, when a change in branding policy was introduced, and the majority of Sky News output was rebranded as simply Sky News. In October 2016, the programme was axed as part of a schedule change.

Rivals
The programme's main rival was BBC News at Five, anchored by Huw Edwards on BBC News. Channel 5 also aired 5 News at 5 - their main news programme - at the same time.

Presenters

1989 British television series debuts
2016 British television series endings
1990s British television series
2000s British television series
Sky News
Sky UK original programming
Sky television news shows